Nataliya Vladimirovna Kondratyeva (born 28 April 1986 in Samara, Russia) is a Russian judoka who competes in the women's 48 kg category. At the 2012 Summer Olympics, she was defeated in the first round.

References

External links
 

1986 births
Living people
Russian female judoka
Olympic judoka of Russia
Judoka at the 2012 Summer Olympics
Sportspeople from Samara, Russia
Doping cases in judo
Russian sportspeople in doping cases
Universiade medalists in judo
Universiade silver medalists for Russia
21st-century Russian women